Karina Villa is a Democratic Illinois state senator for the 25th District. The 25th district, located in the Chicago metropolitan area, includes all or parts of Aurora, North Aurora, Batavia, West Chicago, South Elgin, and Bartlett. Villa is the Chair of the Senate Public Health Committee and was previously a member of the Illinois House of Representatives.

Prior to her election to the Illinois House of Representatives, she was a member of the West Chicago District 33 Board of Education.

Illinois House of Representatives 
Villa defeated DuPage County Board member Tonia Khouri in the 2018 general election to succeed retiring incumbent Republican Mike Fortner in the Illinois House of Representatives for District 49.

Committee assignments 
In the 101st General Assembly, Villa sat on the House Committees on Appropriations - Elementary and Secondary Education; Elementary and Secondary Education School Curriculum Policies; Healthcare Availability and Access; Mental Health; Veterans' Affairs; and Labor and Commerce.

Illinois Senate 
In 2020, incumbent State Senator Jim Oberweis announced that he was vacating his seat to run for the Republican nomination to challenge Lauren Underwood in the 2020 election for Illinois's 14th congressional district. Villa chose to run for the open seat and defeated Republican candidate Jeanette Ward. Villa was succeeded by fellow Democrat Maura Hirschauer.

In 2022, Villa was reelected to the Senate in a redrawn 25th district that included far more of central Aurora and left out St. Charles, Oswego, and Yorkville. She defeated Republican Heather Brown. During the campaign, Villa maintained her support for the SAFE-T Act, which Brown opposed, and campaigned alongside Governor JB Pritzker, U.S Representative-elect Delia Ramirez, and state Representative Maura Hirschauer.

Committee assignments 
In the 102nd General Assembly, Villa was the Vice-Chairperson of the Senate Behavioral and Mental Health Committee. She also served on the Committees on Agriculture; Education; and Pensions.

In the 103rd General Assembly, Villa is the Chairperson of the Public Health Committee. She also sits on the Committees on Agriculture; Apropriations; Behavioral and Mental Health; Health and Human Services; Human Rights; and the Special Committee on Pensions.

Votes and legislation

Workers' rights 

 Voted in favor of raising the state minimum wage to $15 an hour
 Co-sponsored HB 834, which required employees to be paid equally
 Voted in favor of HB 1653, which would have increased penalties for employers who commit wage theft
 Voted in favor of SB 471, which established worker protections for health emergencies 
 Co-sponsored HB 2455, which would have authorized worker compensation for essential and frontline workers during the COVID-19 pandemic

Voting rights 

 Voted in favor of allowing people in jail who have not been convicted of a crime to vote
 Voted in favor of SB-1970, which authorized student absences for voting
 Voted in favor of expanding absentee voting for the 2020 general election
 Co-sponsored HB 1871, which would have expanded ballot drop-boxes and curbside voting

Education  

 Voted in favor of SB 10, which increased the mandatory baseline salaries for public school teachers in the state
 Sponsored HB 2691, which authorized tuition assistance to students who are trans or undocumented
 Co-sponsored HB 2265, which requires civics education to be taught in grades 6, 7, and 8
 Co-sponsored HB 246, which requires public schools to teach about prominent LGBTQ+ historical figures
 Co-sponsored HB 2170, which requires school curriculum to emphasize Black and minority group contributions
 Co-sponsored SB 817, prohibiting school discrimination against certain hairstyles
 Co-sponsored HB 158, which requires schools to provide free period products in school bathrooms

Police and prison policy  

 Voted in favor of HB 1613, which requires police to keep records on racial profiling
 Voted in favor of allowing people in jail who have not been convicted of a crime to vote
 Sponsored HB 2040, which prohibits private prisons and jails in Illinois
 Voted in favor of abolishing cash bail

LGBTQ+ rights 

 Co-sponsored HB 246, which requires public schools to teach about prominent LGBTQ+ historical figures
 Voted in favor of HB 3534, which added a nonbinary gender marker option for state ID's

Cannabis 

 Voted in favor of HB 1438, which legalized recreational cannabis in Illinois

Racial justice 

 Voted in favor of HB 1613, which requires police to keep records on racial profiling
 Co-sponsored HB 2170, which requires school curriculum to emphasize Black and minority group contributions
 Co-sponsored HB 158, which aims to reduce racial disparities in medical care
 Co-sponsored SB 817 prohibiting school discrimination against certain hairstyles

Immigration 

 Sponsored HB 836, which authorized temporary guardians for the children of people who have been deported
 Sponsored HB 1553, which authorized certain kinds of visas for undocumented children that are victims of abuse, neglect, or abandonment
 Co-sponsored SB 667, which would have prohibited cities and counties from entering into contracts with Immigration and Customs Enforcement

Climate and energy 

 Voted in favor of requiring all energy production to be from renewable sources by 2050

Health care and abortion 

 Voted in favor of repealing the Parental Notice of Abortion Act
 Co-sponsored HB 158, which aims to reduce racial disparities in medical care
 Co-sponsored SB 25, which established abortion rights protections
 Co-sponsored HB 2, which established rights for people in pregnancy and childbirth 
 Co-sponsored HB 345, which prohibited tobacco products, e-cigarettes, and alternative nicotine products for people under the age of 21
 Co-sponsored SB 667, which limits the cost of insulin to $100 per 30 day supply
 Co-sponsored HB 158, which requires schools to provide free period products in school bathrooms
 Co-sponsored HB 1321, which authorizes access to mental health resources for first responders

Personal life 
Villa earned her master of social work at Aurora University and worked as a school social worker in Villa Park District 45.

Villa resides in West Chicago.

Electoral history

References

External links
 Campaign website

Year of birth missing (living people)
21st-century American politicians
21st-century American women politicians
Aurora University alumni
People from West Chicago, Illinois
Women state legislators in Illinois
Democratic Party members of the Illinois House of Representatives
Democratic Party Illinois state senators
Hispanic and Latino American state legislators in Illinois
Living people